is a railway station in Hamamatsuchō, Minato, Tokyo, Japan, operated by East Japan Railway Company (JR East) and also by Tokyo Monorail.

Lines
Hamamatsuchō Station is served by two JR East lines: the circular Yamanote Line and Keihin-Tōhoku Line. All trains on these lines stop at Hamamatsuchō.

It is also the terminus of the Tokyo Monorail line to Haneda Airport.

Station layout

JR East

The JR East station consists of two platforms serving four tracks, with cross-platform interchange in the direction of travel between the Yamanote line (tracks 2 and 3) and the Keihin-Tōhoku line (tracks 1 and 4).

Tokyo Monorail

The Tokyo Monorail platforms are located to the west of the JR station in a separate elevated structure. Two side platforms serve a single track, with one platform used for boarding passengers, and the other platform used for alighting passengers.

Japan's domestic airlines (JAL, ANA, Skymark Airlines, and Air Do) operate check in services for domestic flights from Haneda airport along with ticketing facilities just outside the main Monorail entrances.

Facilities
 Japan Airlines at one time operated a domestic flights only ticketing facility on the third floor of the station.

History
The JR station opened on December 16, 1909, as an intermediate station on the newly opened Shinagawa to Karasumori section of the Japanese National Railways.

The Tokyo Monorail station opened on September 17, 1964.

Passenger statistics
In fiscal 2013, the JR East station was used by an average of 155,784 passengers daily (boarding passengers only), making it the sixteenth-busiest station operated by JR East. Over the same fiscal year, the Tokyo Monorail station was used by an average of 108,080 passengers daily (exiting and entering passengers), making it the busiest station operated by Tokyo Monorail.

The passenger figures for the JR East station (boarding passengers only) for previous years are as shown below.

Surrounding area
Daimon Station, served by the Toei Ōedo Line and the Toei Asakusa Line, is within easy walking distance, although some route maps do not mark them as an interchange. The 1-minute walk is fully signed and easy to locate. When arriving on a train from south, train cars at the front of the train are closest to the exit to Daimon station.
The station is partially under and directly connected to the World Trade Center (Tokyo).
Acty Shiodome, the fourth tallest residential building in Japan is a 3-minute walk to the north.
Hamarikyu Gardens - 1/2 mile north-east
Kyu Shiba Rikyu Garden - 1/8 mile east
Shiodome City Center Shopping Mall - 10-minute walk
Tsukiji Fish Market - 15-minute walk
 Hato Bus Tour terminal

See also

 List of railway stations in Japan
 Transport in Greater Tokyo

References

External links

 JR East station information 
 JR East station diagram 
 Tokyo Monorail station information 

Yamanote Line
Keihin-Tōhoku Line
Tokyo Monorail Haneda Line
Stations of East Japan Railway Company
Stations of Tokyo Monorail
Tōkaidō Main Line
Railway stations in Tokyo
Railway stations in Japan opened in 1909